The 1924 Birthday Honours were appointments by King George V to various orders and honours to reward and highlight good works by citizens of the British Empire. The appointments were made to celebrate the official birthday of The King, and were published in The London Gazette on 3 June 1924.

The recipients of honours are displayed here as they were styled before their new honour, and arranged by honour, with classes (Knight, Knight Grand Cross, etc.) and then divisions (Military, Civil, etc.) as appropriate.

United Kingdom and British Empire

Privy Councillor
The King appointed the following to His Majesty's Most Honourable Privy Council:
Thomas Power O'Connor  For political services

Baronetcies
Alexander Grant, Chairman of the firm of McVittie and Price. For public services. 
Sir Humphry Davy Rolleston  President of the Royal College of Physicians

Knight Bachelor
Gerald Bellhouse  Chief Inspector of Factories, Home Office
David Young Cameron  In recognition of his contributions to Art
Richard Davies  Deputy, Alderman and Chief Commoner, Corporation, of London
William Galloway  For public services
Benjamin Hawkins, Solicitor to the Board of Customs and Excise
Fred Hiam, For public services
George Anthony King  Chief Master, Supreme Court Taxing Office
Charles Mendl, For services to His Majesty's Embassy, Paris
Harold George Parlett  Japanese Counsellor of His Majesty's Embassy, Tokyo
The Rt. Hon. William Lowrie Sleigh  Lord Provost of Edinburgh
Alderman John Utting  Chairman of Finance Committee, Liverpool Corporation. Lord Mayor of Liverpool, 1917–18
Ralph Lewis Wedgwood  General Manager, London and North Eastern Railway
Arthur Smith Woodward  lately Keeper of Geology in the British Museum

British India
Provash Chandra Mitter  Vakil, High Court, Calcutta, Bengal, late Minister, Government of Bengal
Justice Victor Murray Coutts-Trotter, Chief Justice, Madras High Court,
Justice Babington Bennett Newbould, Indian Civil Service, Puisne Judge, High Court, Calcutta, Bengal
Justice Henry Scott-Smith, Indian Civil Service, Puisne Judge, High Court, Lahore, Punjab
Justice Theodore Garo Piggott, Indian Civil Service, Puisne Judge, High Court, Allahabad, United Provinces
Montagu Sherard Dawes Butler  Indian Civil Service, Secretary to the Government of India in the Department of Education, Health and Lands
Peter Henry Clutterbuck  Inspector-General of Forests
Gilbert Thomas Walker  Director-General of Observatories in India
Lieutenant-Colonel Thomas John Carey-Evans  Indian Medical Service, Surgeon to His Excellency The Viceroy
Alexander James Anderson  President, Chamber of Commerce, Rangoon, Burma
Sardar Khan Bahadur Rustomji Jehangirji Vakil, Partner in several Spinning and Weaving Companies, and Member of the Board of Directors of other business concerns in Ahmedabad, Bombay
Alfred Percival Symonds, Director, Messrs. Binny and Company Limited, Madras
Mahamadbhai Currimbhai Ebrahim, Mill-owner and Philanthropist, Bombay
M. R. Ry. Diwan Bahadur Raghupathi Venkataratnam Naidu Garu, Principal (retired) of the Raja's College, Pithapuram, Madras

Colonies, Protectorates, etc.
John Ernest Adamson  Director of Education for the Province of Transvaal, Union of South Africa; in recognition of his services to Education
Charles Ernest St. John Branch, Chief Justice of the Supreme Court of Jamaica
Thomas Melrose Coombe, of the City of Perth, State of Western Australia, President of the Theatre Managers, Proprietors and Theatrical Association; in recognition of his public services
Thomas Edward de Sampayo, Puisne Justice of the Supreme Court of Ceylon
James Henry Gunson  Mayor of the City of Auckland, New Zealand; in recognition of his public services
Henry Edward Pollock  Member of the Executive Council and Senior Unofficial Member of the Legislative Council of Hong Kong
The Hon. William Alexander Sim, Judge of the Supreme Court of New Zealand
John Sulman  of the City of Sydney, Chairman of the Canberra Advisory Committee; in recognition of his services to the Commonwealth of Australia
Malcolm Watson  of Klang, Selangor, Federated Malay States; in recognition of his services in connection with the prevention of Malaria

The Most Honourable Order of the Bath

Knight Grand Cross of the Order of the Bath (GCB)

Military Division
Royal Navy
Admiral Sir Montague Edward Browning 
Admiral Sir Hugh Evan-Thomas 

Royal Air Force
Air Vice Marshal Philip Woolcott Game

Knight Commander of the Order of the Bath (KCB)

Military Division
Royal Navy
Vice-Admiral Allen Thomas Hunt 

Army
Lieutenant-General the Hon. Sir Alan Richard Montagu Stuart Wortley  Quartermaster-General, Headquarters Staff of the Army in India
Major-General the Hon. Sir Francis Richard Bingham  late of the Military Inter-Allied Commission of Control, Berlin, now Lieutenant-Governor and Commanding the Troops, Jersey District

Civil Division
Sir Archibald Henry Bodkin, Director of Public Prosecutions
Sir Ernest Clark  Permanent Secretary, Ministry of Finance, Northern Ireland
Otto Ernst Niemeyer  Controller of Finance, His Majesty's Treasury. 
Horace John Wilson  Permanent Secretary, Ministry of Labour

Companion of the Order of the Bath (CB)

Military Division
Royal Navy
Rear-Admiral Albert Percy Addison 
Surgeon Rear-Admiral Charles Marsh Beadnell
Captain Francis Herbert Mitchell 
Captain Cecil Minet Staveley 

Army
Colonel William Bernard Lauder  Royal Army Pay Corps, Chief Paymaster, The War Office, and Officer in charge of Royal Army Pay Corps Records
Colonel Claud Edward Charles Graham Charlton  Military Attaché, Washington
Colonel Charles William Singer  Chief Engineer, Egypt
Colonel Stuart William Hughes Rawlins  Commandant, Chemical Warfare Experimental Station, Porton
Colonel Charles John Steavenson  late Brigade Commander, 1st Rhine Brigade
Lieutenant-Colonel and Brevet Colonel Hugh Clifford Fernyhough  Royal Army Ordnance Corps, Ordnance Officer, 2nd Class, Assistant Director of Ordnance Services, Northern Command
Colonel Henry Arthur Peyton Lindsay  Indian Army, Inspector of Supplies and Transport, India
Colonel Philip Frederick Pocock  Indian Army, Brigade Commander, 15th Indian Infantry Brigade
Colonel John Patrick Villiers-Stuart  Indian Army, General Staff Officer, 1st Grade, Staff College, Camberley
Colonel Bernard Underwood Nicolay, Indian Army, Deputy Military Secretary, Headquarters Staff of the Army, India

Royal Air Force
Group Captain Lyster Fettiplace Blandy

Civil Division
Engineer Rear-Admiral William Matthias Whayman  
Paymaster Captain Richard Bosustow Hosking  
Colonel Godfrey Davenport Goodman  late Brigade Commander, 139th (Sherwood Foresters), Infantry Brigade, Territorial Army
Lieutenant-Colonel Edwin Wilfred Stanyforth  late Yorkshire Hussars Yeomanry, and Territorial Force Reserve
Gerald Bain Canny, Commissioner of Inland Revenue
Reginald Alexander Dalzell  Director of Telegraphs and Telephones, General Post Office
Henry Augustus Ferguson-Davie, Principal Clerk of Public Bill Office and Clerk of the Fees, House of Commons
Alfred Edward Faulkner  Director of Sea Transport, Board of Trade
Ralph Endersby Harwood  Deputy Treasurer to H.M. The King
Norman Gerald Loughnane, Principal, Ministry of Pensions
Alexander Maxwell, Assistant Secretary, Home Office
John William Lambton Oliver  Director of Naval Stores, Admiralty
Rowland Arthur Charles Sperling  His Majesty's Minister, Berne
Leonard Day Wakely, Secretary, Political Department, India Office
Charles Fell Watherston, Assistant Secretary and Actuary, War Office

Order of Merit (OM)

Francis Herbert Bradley, Fellow of Merton College, Oxford
Sir Charles Scott Sherrington

The Most Exalted Order of the Star of India

Knight Grand Commander (GCSI)
Colonel His Highness Sewai Maharaj Shri Jey Singh  Maharaja of Alwar, Rajputana
James Lyle, Viscount Inchcape

Knight Commander (KCSI)
His Highness Maharajadhiraja Maharao Sarup Ram Singh Bahadur, Maharao of Sirohi, Rajputana

Companion (CSI)
Donald Hector Lees, Indian Civil Service, Member, Board of Revenue, Bengal
Henry Phillips Tollinton  Indian Civil Service, Commissioner, Punjab
Arthur Wyndham McNair  Indian Civil Service, Commissioner, Rohilkhand Division, United Provinces
Frank Noyce  Indian Civil Service, Secretary to Government, Development Department, Madras
William Sutherland  Chief Engineer, Telegraphs
Captain Edward James Headlam  Director, Royal Indian Marine, Bombay
Samuel Findlater Stewart  Secretary, Military Department, India Office, lately Joint Secretary to the Royal Commission on the Superior Civil Service in India

The Most Distinguished Order of Saint Michael and Saint George

Knight Commander of the Order of St Michael and St George (KCMG)

The Hon. Austin Chapman, Minister for Trade and Customs, Commonwealth of Australia
Arthur Cuninghame Grant Duff, His Majesty's Envoy Extraordinary and Minister Plenipotentiary to the Republic of Chile
Maximillian Michaelis, of the City of Cape Town; in recognition of services rendered to the Union of South Africa
Herbert James Stanley  Governor and Commander-in-Chief of Northern Rhodesia

Companion of the Order of St Michael and St George (CMG)
Bernard Henry Bourdillon, Secretary to the High Commissioner for Iraq
Samuel George Campbell, of the City of Durban, Union of South Africa; in recognition of his public services
George Ridwin Emery, General Manager of the State Savings Bank, State of Victoria
David Sampson Gideon, Member of the Privy Council and Member of the Legislative Council of Jamaica
The Hon. William Muter Leggate, Minister of Lands and Agriculture of the Colony of Southern Rhodesia
Alexander Francis Lowe, Clerk of Parliaments and Clerk of the Legislative-Council of New Zealand
Ranald MacDonald  Comptroller of Customs, Nyasaland
Hayes Marriott, General Adviser, Johore, Malay States
George Henry Monahan, Clerk of the-Senate of the Commonwealth of Australia
James Watt, lately a Senior Resident the Southern Provinces of Nigeria
George Augustus Mounsey  Counsellor in the Foreign Office

On the termination of the administrative functions of the British South Africa Company in Northern Rhodesia —

Richard Allmond Jeffrey Goode  Chief Secretary to the Government, formerly Deputy Administrator and Secretary to the Administration, Northern Rhodesia
Aylmer William May  Principal Medical Officer, Northern Rhodesia

Honorary Companion
Sanda Kura, the Shehu of Bornu, Nigeria
Raja Abdul Aziz, the Raja Muda of Perak, Federated Malay States

The Most Eminent Order of the Indian Empire

Knight Grand Commander (GCIE)
His Highness Shri Rajaram Chhatrapati Maharaj, Maharaja of Kolhapur, Bombay

Knight Commander (KCIE)

Sir Chimanlal Harilal Setalvad, ex-Member of Executive Council, Bombay
Hugh McPherson  Indian Civil Service, Member of the Executive Council, Bihar and Orissa
William James Reid  Indian Civil Service, Member of the Executive Council, Assam
Sir Edward Maynard des Champs Chamier, Legal Adviser to the Secretary of State for India, lately President, Indian Bar Committee
Khan Bahadur Sayyid Mehdi Shah  Honorary Magistrate and President, Municipal Committee, Gojra, Lyallpur District, Punjab
Khan Bahadur Sir Muhammad Habibullah, Sahib Bahadur  Member of the Executive Council, Madras

Companion (CIE)

Wilfred Thomas Mermund Wright, Indian Civil Service, Joint Secretary to the Government of India in the Legislative Department
Arthur Norman Moberly, Indian Civil Service, Officiating Chief Secretary to the Government of Bengal
The Reverend Earle Monteith Macphail  Vice-Chancellor, University of Madras
Lieutenant-Colonel Gordon Risley Hearn  Royal Engineers, Agent, Eastern Bengal Railway, Bengal
Charles Ervans William Jones, Indian Educational Service, Director of Public Instruction and Secretary to the Government of the Central Provinces
Colonel Richard Heard, Indian Medical Service, Honorary Surgeon to His Majesty the King, Surgeon-General with the Government of Bengal
Upendralal Majumdar, late Accountant-General
Philip Edward Percival, Indian Civil Service, District and Sessions Judge, Bombay, and Member, Indian Legislative Assembly
Loftus Otway Clarke, Indian Civil Service, Political Agent in Manipur, Assam
Kenneth Neville Knox, Indian Civil Service, Collector of Allahabad, United Provinces
Eric Conran Smith, Indian Civil Service, Private Secretary to His Excellency the Governor of Madras
Major George Cumine Strahan Black  Private Secretary to His Excellency the Governor of the Punjab
Mirza Mohamed Ismail, Private Secretary to His Highness the Maharaja of Mysore
John Murray Ewart, Superintendent of Police, in charge Intelligence Bureau and CID., Peshawar, North-West Frontier Province
Raj Bahadur Taruck Nath Sadhu, Public Prosecutor, Bengal
William James Lister  Honorary Treasurer of the Red Cross Society, Punjab
Bhupatiraju Venkatapatiraju Garu, Member of the Legislative Assembly
Frederick Clayton, Partner in Messrs. Fleming, Shaw and Company, Bombay
Diwan Bahadur Shrinivas Konhar Rodda, President of the District Local Board of Dharwar, Bombay
Frederick Young, Assistant Superintendent of Police, United Provinces
Raj Bahadur Gobind Lai Sijuar, Gayawal, Bihar and Orissa
Francis Foster Goodliffe, Merchant, Rangoon, Burma
Khan Bahadur Sardar Asghar Ali, Manager of a Book Bureau for Indian Soldiers, Punjab
Arthur William Street, Principal, Ministry of Agriculture and Fisheries, lately Joint Secretary to the Royal Commission on the Superior Civil Services in India

The Royal Victorian Order

Knight Grand Cross of the Royal Victorian Order (GCVO)
His Royal Highness The Prince George

Knight Commander of the Royal Victorian Order (KCVO)
Colonel The Hon. George Arthur Charles Crichton 
Lieutenant-Colonel Sir Arthur Leetham  
Walter Peacock 
William Fairbank

Commander of the Royal Victorian Order (CVO)
Major The Hon. Caryl Arthur James Annesley
Harry Robert Boyd 
Herbert Edward Mitchell

Member of the Royal Victorian Order, 4th class (MVO)
Major Norman Henry Prendergast 
Captain Daniel Hickey  (Fifth Class). (Dated 29 May 1924)
George Edward Miles  (Fifth Class)
Charles John Dalrymple-Hay
Arthur Gabriel Morrish

Member of the Royal Victorian Order, 5th class (MVO)
Thomas McEwen 
Lieutenant Rudolf Peter O'Donnell  Director of Music

The Most Excellent Order of the British Empire

Dame Grand Cross of the Order of the British Empire (GBE)

Marie Adelaide, Baroness Willingdon 
Her Highness the Rani Shiv Kunwar Sahiba, Senior Rani and Rani-Regent of Narsingarh, Central India

Knight Grand Cross of the Order of the British Empire (GBE)

Military Division
Admiral Sir Alexander Ludovic Duff 
Field-Marshal Herbert Charles Onslow, Baron Plumer  Governor and Commander-in-Chief of the Island of Malta

Civil Division

Robert Donald  For public services. Chairman of the Council of the Empire Press Union
Sir Howard George Frank  lately Chairman of the Disposal and Liquidation Commission. For public services.
Sir Josiah Charles Stamp  For public services

Diplomatic Service and Overseas List
Sir Mansfeldt de Cardonnel Findlay  lately His Majesty's Minister at Christiania

Dame Commander of the Order of the British Empire (DBE)

Henrietta Octavia Weston Barnett  For public services
Janet Mary Campbell  Senior Medical Officer for Maternity and Child Welfare, Ministry of Health, and Chief Woman Medical Adviser, Board of Education

Knight Commander of the Order of the British Empire (KBE)

Military Division
Royal Navy
Admiral William Hannam Henderson

Army
Major-General Wilfred William Ogilvy Beveridge  (retired pay)

Civil Division
John Arthur Corcoran  Assistant Under Secretary of State for War and Director of Army Contracts
William Vibart Dixon  late Deputy Chief Clerk of the West Riding of Yorkshire County Council
Sir John Lindsay, Town Clerk of Glasgow. For public services.
Charles Henry Lawrence Neish  Registrar of the Privy Council
James William Olive  Deputy Commissioner of Metropolitan Police
Sir Henry Strakosch. For public services.

Diplomatic Service and Overseas List
Charles Bell Child Clipperton  Inspector General of Consulates
Ernest Macleod Dowson  Financial Adviser in Cairo since 1920
Lieutenant-Colonel Francis Henry Humphrys  Indian Army
Malcolm Arnold Robertson  His Majesty's Minister at Tangier

Colonies, Protectorates, etc.

John Middleton  Governor and Commander-in-Chief of the Colony of the Falkland Islands
William George Maxwell  Chief Secretary to the Government, Federated Malay States
Sir Mark Sheldon, of the City of Sydney; in recognition of his services to the Commonwealth of Australia
George Adlington Syme  recognition of his services to the State of Victoria
Theodoras Gustaff Truter  Chief Commissioner of Police, Union of South Africa

Commander of the Order of the British Empire (CBE)

Military Division
Royal Navy
Engineer Rear-Admiral Frederick William Marshall
Paymaster Captain Alfred Charles Ransom 
Commander Guybon Chesney Castell Damant  (retired)
Major and Brevet Lieutenant-Colonel Robert Daly Ormsby  (1879-1946)
Captain Francis Richard Henry Penn, Viscount Curzon 

Army
Lieutenant-Colonel Ernest Francis William Barker  Royal Corps of Signals
Major and Brevet Lieutenant-Colonel Frank Passy Dunlop  The Worcestershire Regiment
Lieutenant-Colonel Sinclair Gair  6th Battalion (Territorial), The Seaforth Highlanders
Lieutenant-Colonel and Brevet Colonel (temporary Colonel) James Crawford Kennedy  Royal Army Medical Corps
Major and Brevet Lieutenant-Colonel Alfred Owen Needham  7th Battalion (Territorial), The Lancashire Fusiliers
Colonel Cecil Charles Palmer
Major and Brevet Lieutenant-Colonel Charles Westrope Selby  Royal Artillery
Margaret Steenson  Matron, Queen Alexandra's Imperial Military Nursing Service
Major-General Herbert Fothergill Cooke  Indian Army
Colonel David Campbell Crombie, Indian Army
Colonel Francis Bede Heritage  Commandant, Royal Military College of Australia, Duntroon 
Captain John Malet Llewellyn, The Devonshire Regiment and 3rd Battalion The King's African Rifles; Officer Commanding Troops, Kenya Colony

Royal Air Force
Air Commodore John Glanville Hearson 

In recognition of the valuable sendees rendered in the recent successful seaplane flight round Australia —
Wing Commander Stanley James Goble  Royal Australian Air Force
Flight Lieutenant Ivor Ewing Mclntyre  Royal Australian Air Force

Civil Division

Ernest Edwin Beare, Secretary to the Government Hospitality Fund
Alderman Charles Hayward Bird, Chairman of the Cardiff Local Employment Committee
Captain Donald Bremner, Assistant Commissioner, City of London Police
Charles Herbert Bressey  Chief Engineer, Roads Department, Ministry of Transport
Herbert Edward Burgess, Senior Official Receiver
Professor Edward Provan Cathcart  Professor of Chemical Physiology, Glasgow University. For public services.
Arthur James Dawson  Director of Education, Durham
Robert Browne Dunwoody  Secretary, Association of British Chambers of Commerce
Joseph Farndale  Chief Constable, Bradford
Joseph Jessop Farrell, Deputy Chief Inspector of Taxes, Board of Inland Revenue
Marjory Kennedy-Fraser, In recognition of her contributions to folk music
Ernest John Harrington  Deputy Accountant General, General Post Office
Mary Verona Campbell Hay, Chairman and Founder of Queen Alexandra Hospital Home, Roehampton
Lieutenant-Colonel Cyril Emmerson Hughes, Deputy Director of Works, Gallipoli, Imperial War Graves Commission
Arthur Herbert Ley  Indian Civil Service, Controller of Sales in India under the Disposal and Liquidation Commission
Ernest Alan Lidbury, Assistant Secretary, Board of Customs and Excise
Henry Willoughby Lowell, Marshal of the Admiralty and Prize Court, Royal Courts of Justice
Kenneth Lyon  Principal Private Secretary to Secretary of State, for War
James Dalgleish Kellie-MacCallum  Chief Constable of Northamptonshire
Captain Jasper Graham Mayne  Secretary, Army Rifle Association
Harry Ekermans Oakley  Deputy Director of Works and Buildings, Air Ministry
Charles Reed Peers, Chief Inspector of Ancient Monuments
William Christopher Dowling Prendergast  In recognition of his services in combating lead poisoning
(William Dalgleish Scott  Assistant Secretary, Ministry of Finance, Northern Ireland
Harry Smith, Chief Inspector, Employment and Insurance Department, Ministry of Labour
Major Herbert Eames Spencer  Director of Passport Control Office, Foreign Office
The Reverend Canon Norman Sprankling, formerly Chairman of the Metropolitan Asylums Board
Reginald Townsend, Chief Superintendent of Ordnance Factories, War Office
Lieutenant-Colonel Thomas Turnbull  Alderman of the City of Manchester, Chairman of Manchester and District War Pensions Committee
Arthur Joseph Wall  Secretary to the Prison Commissioners for England and Wales
Lieutenant-Colonel Herbert Lawton Warden  Regional Director for Scotland, Ministry of Pensions
Walter Aldington Willis, Member of the Panel of Chairmen for Boards of Arbitration under Industrial Courts Act, 1919
Walter Baldwyn Yates, Crown Umpire for Unemployment Insurance

Diplomatic Service and Overseas List
George Percy Churchill, lately Oriental Secretary to His Majesty's Legation at Tehran
George Alexander Combe, Acting Consul General at Cheng-tu
Lionel Stanley Hargreaves, Custodian of Enemy Property in Egypt
George Pearson Paton, Assistant Commercial Agent at Vladivostok
Robert Wilberforce, Director of the British Library of Information, New York

Colonies, Protectorates, etc.
William Henry Barkley, Collector of Customs, Commonwealth of Australia
Lieutenant-Colonel Percy Neville Buckley, formerly Military Adviser to the High Commissioner in London for the Commonwealth of Australia
Donald George Clark  Commissioner of Taxes, New Zealand
William Lance Conlay, Commissioner of Police, Federated Malay States
George Frederick Copus, Finance Officer in the Office of the High Commissioner in London for New Zealand
Herbert Ferguson, Colonial Secretary and Registrar-General, Windward Islands
George Ball Greene, Assistant Colonial Secretary of the Colony of British Guiana
Roger Greene, Secretary to. the High Commissioner for the Western Pacific
Musa Irfan Bey, Member of the Executive and Legislative Councils of the Island of Cyprus
Bertram Nicholson  Deputy Resident Commissioner and Government Secretary, Swaziland, South Africa
Eyton Campbell Oldham, Chief Electoral Officer of the Commonwealth of Australia
Herbert Richmond Palmer  Resident of the Province of Bornu, Northern Provinces, Nigeria, in recognition of specially valuable services recently rendered to the Government of Nigeria.
William Henry Poultney; in recognition of his public services to the Union of South Africa.
John Ramsay, of Launceston, State of Tasmania; in recognition of his public services
Lieutenant-Colonel Joseph Ramsay Tainsh  Director of Railways, Iraq

British India
Lieutenant-Colonel Charles Gilbert Crosthwaite  Deputy Commissioner, Peshawar, North-West Frontier Province
Lieutenant-Colonel Frederick Grattan Moore (Assistant Secretary in the Army Department), late Secretary to the Soldiers Board
Alexander Warren Mercer, Deputy Inspector-General of Police, Punjab
Vasantrao Anandrao Dabholkar  Member of Legislative Council, Bombay
Margaret Ida Balfour  Joint Secretary of the Dufferin Fund
Doctor San C. Po, Medical Practitioner and Municipal Commissioner, Bassein, Burma

On the termination of the administrative functions of the British South Africa Company in Southern Rhodesia and in Northern Rhodesia —
Colonel Algernon Essex Capell  Commissioner, British South Africa Police, Southern Rhodesia
Alfred Milroy Fleming  Medical Director, Southern Rhodesia, and Principal Medical Officer, British South Africa Police, and formerly Member of the Legislative Council, Southern Rhodesia
Colonel Harry March Stennett  Commandant of the Northern Rhodesia Police

Officer of the Order of the British Empire (OBE)

Military Division
Royal Navy
Paymaster Commander Oswald Carter
Surgeon Commander Robert William Basil Hall
Engineer Commander Frank Moorison 
Commander Henry Richard Sawbridge 
Commander Charles Geoffrey Coleridge Sumner 
Paymaster Commander Harold Vincent Such

Army
Quartermaster and Major James Betts  Extra Regimentally Employed List
Captain Percy Kenneth Boulnois  Royal Engineers
Lieutenant-Colonel George Charles Knight Clowes  14th London Regiment, Territorial Army
Lieutenant-Colonel Thomas Jenkins David  81st (Welsh) Brigade, Royal Field Artillery, Territorial Army
Major and Brevet Lieutenant-Colonel Malcolm Gordon Douglas  Honourable Artillery Company, Territorial Army
Major Frank Lucas Netlam Giles  Royal Engineers
Captain John Bagot Glubb  Royal Engineers
Major Boland Hamilton, Royal Engineers
Major and Brevet Lieutenant-Colonel Ernest Hewlett  The Devonshire Regiment
Lieutenant-Colonel Horace Musgrave Hewison  The Argyll and Sutherland Highlanders
Major Harold Crossley Hildreth  Royal Army Medical Corps
Major Nelson Low  Royal Army Medical Corps
Major and Brevet Lieutenant-Colonel Gordon Ponsonby MacClellan  Royal-Artillery, late Royal Garrison Artillery
Captain George Sims Marshall  9th Battalion (Territorial) The Durham Light Infantry
Lieutenant-Colonel Walter Pepys  The Warwickshire Yeomanry, Territorial Army
Major Frederick Emilius Roberts  Royal Army Medical Corps
Lieutenant-Colonel Henry Gordon Roberts  4th Battalion (Territorial), The Prince of Wales's Volunteers
Captain Bernal John Eyan  56th (1st London) Divisional Engineers, Royal Engineers, Territorial Army
Temp. Major Reginald Ernest Sanders  Royal Army Service Corps
Major Philip Achilles Kingston Townshend, The Royal Berkshire Regiment
Lieutenant-Colonel Francis Tyrwhitt Drake Wilson, 1st Battalion, The Suffolk Regiment
Quartermaster and Major Harry Evans Worthing  2nd Battalion, The Rifle Brigade
Captain Angus Rankin Campbell, Indian Army Reserve of Officers, attached Indian Army Service Corps
Captain Wallace Adelbert Lyon, 12th Frontier Force Regiment, Indian Army
Captain Eugene Daniel McCarthy, 10th Baluch Regiment, Indian Army
Captain Henry William Frederick McCleery, 12th Cavalry (Frontier Force), Indian Army
Captain Reginald Vivian Robinson, Indian Army Reserve of Officers, attached Indian Army Service Corps
Captain Arthur Lionel Rogers, Indian Army Beserve of Officers
Major Donald Brackenbury Ross, 14th Punjab Regiment, Indian Army
Lieutenant-Colonel Mervyn Robert Howe Webber, 1st Duke of York's Own Skinner's Horse, Indian Army
Major Arthur Newell Ogilvie, The North Staffordshire Regiment, latei Commanding Sierra Leone Battalion, West African Frontier Force

Royal Air Force
Squadron Leader Charles Hubert Boulby Blount 
Flight Lieutenant Maurice Moore 
Flight Lieutenant Gerald Momington Bryer 
Captain John Holthouse, South African Air Force

Civil Division

George Bruce, Chief Constable of Dunfermline
Major John Scoular Buchanan, Senior Assistant, Directorate of Research, Air Ministry
Lieutenant-Colonel Alan George Chichester  Chief Constable of Huntingdonshire
Charles William Dixon  Principal, Colonial Office
William Dobson, Governor of His Majesty's Prison, Bedford
Captain Charles Howard Ensor, County Commandant, Ulster Special Constabulary
Arthur Ernest Evans  Chairman, Wrexham Local Employment Committee
George Thomas Fidler  Accountant, Ministry of Finance, Northern Ireland
Charles Lavington Fielder  Chief Surveyor of Lands, Civil Engineer in Chief's Department, Admiralty
James Forbes  Superintending Inspector, Board of Customs and Excise
John Gaskell, Chief Clerk, Bow Street Police Court
Charles William Grant  Principal Officer, Ministry of Home Affairs, Northern Ireland
Alderman William Groves  Chairman, Stepney Local Employment Committee
James Ernest Hagger, Controller of Statistical Department, Board of Customs and Excise
William, Baker Hartridge, For services to Disposal and Liquidation Commission
Councillor Alfred William Haynes  Chairman of the Swindon, Chippenham and District War Pensions Committee
Edward Holmes, Chief Constable of Leicestershire
Ebenezer Howard  President of the International Garden Cities and Town Planning Federation
William Stephens Hughes, Chief Constable of the City of Lincoln
Major Edgar Mortimore Lafone, Chief Constable, Metropolitan Police
The Reverend Oanon Frederick Charles Macdonald  Chairman, West Hartlepool Local Employment Committee
Jean Adolphe Mauger, Acting Chief Clerk, War Compensation Court
Charles William Hayley Mason, Superintending Valuer, Board of Inland Revenue
Robert Lee Matthews;  Chief Constable of Leeds
Captain George Tyrrell McCaw  Civil Assistant in Geographical Section, General Staff, War Office
William James McGaw, Inspector,0 Ministry of Agriculture, Northern Ireland
Gertrude McKinnell, Voluntary Worker, Northampton and District War Pensions Committee
Robert Lindsay Megarry, Principal, Air Ministry
Alfred Sargent, Inspector of Merrifield, Taxes, Board of Senior Inland Revenue
John Morran, Chief Constable of Roxburgh, Berwick and Selkirk
William Sneyd Moore, County Inspector, Royal Ulster Constabulary
Arthur Frederick Nicholson, Chief Constable of Exeter
Captain John Scott Parker, Chief Horticultural Officer, Imperial War Graves Commission
William Phillips, Chairman, Pontypridd Local Employment Committee
Otto Schiff  For public services
John Stuart Scrimgeour For services to Disposal and Liquidation Commission
Leslie Robert Sherwood, Senior Establishment and Accounts Officer, Foreign Office
Frederick Bertram Sutherland, Principal, Ministry of Labour
The Reverend David John Thomas  Chairman, Wood Green Local Employment Committee
Nathan Thompson  Inspector-General of Waterguard, Board of Customs and Excise
Alderman Alfred George Turley, Chairman, West Bromwich Local Employment Committee
James Arthur Wilson  Chief Constable of Cardiff
James Yates, Principal Officer, Ministry of Education, Northern Ireland

Diplomatic Service and Overseas List
Henry Allan Fairfax Best Archer, Acting Consul at Chung King
Shirley Clifford Atchley, Local First Secretary at His Majesty's Legation at Athens
Charles Frederick Albert Bristow, Superintending Archivist at His Majesty's Legation, Buenos Aires
The Reverend James Chambers, Chaplain at the English Church, Amsterdam
Walter Everard Fuller  Superintendent Archivist at Paris
Alexander Knox Helm, Third Dragoman at His Majesty's Embassy, Constantinople
Charles Richard Lias, Head Master of Victoria College, Alexandria
Arthur Law Mathewson, Vice Consul at Medan, Sumatra
George Frederick Steward, Press Officer at His Majesty's Embassy, Brussels
William John Hamilton Taylor, His Majesty's Vice Consul at Key West

Colonies, Protectorates, etc.
Ernest Adams, Comptroller of Customs and Custodian of Enemy Property, Tanganyika Territory
Kitoyi Ajasa, Unofficial Member of the Legislative Council, Nigeria
Charles Edward Woolhouse Bannerman, Police Magistrate, Gold Coast
Lieutenant-Colonel Edward Bell  Chief Inspector of Police, Leeward Islands
Captain Walter Henry Calthrop Calthrop  (retired), Master Attendant, Straits Settlements
Stanley York Rales  Custodian of Enemy Property, Union of South Africa
Harington Gordon Forbes, lately Secretary of the British North Borneo Company
James Alfred Galizia, Superintendent of the-Public Works Department, Island of Malta
Charles Herbert Hamilton, of the Office of the General Manager of Railways, Union of South Africa
Lieutenant-Colonel Melville David Harrel, Inspector-General of Police and Commandant of the Local Forces, Barbados
George Jeffery, Curator of Ancient Monuments, Island of Cyprus
Harry Leslie Knaggs, Assistant Colonial Secretary and Clerk of the Executive Council of the Colony of Trinidad and Tobago
George Lyall  lately Senior Assistant Secretary, Uganda Protectorate
Daniel James Oman, Director of Education, Gold Coast
James Russell Orr, Director of Education, Kenya Colony
Cyril Francis Reading, Sub-District Governor of Tulkeram, Palestine
François Auguste Rouget  Medical Superintendent of the Civil Hospital, Mauritius
George Ritchie Sandford, Assistant Secretary in the Secretariat, and Clerk to the Executive and Legislative Councils, Kenya Colony
Alfred James Shorunkeh Sawyer, Unofficial Member of the Legislative Council, Sierra Leone
William Frederick Wainwright, District Commandant of Police, Southern District, Palestine
Alexander Harold White, in charge of the British Section of the Anglo-Belgian Boundary Commission, Tanganyika Territory

British India
Elsai Odgers, Madras
Conrad Allan Cooke  Chief Engineer, Bombay, Baroda and Central India Railway, Ajmer-Merwara
Rama Shankar Bajpai, Assistant Director of Public Information with the Government of India
David Burnett Meek, Director of Industries, Bengal
Major John William Thomson-Glover, Indian Army, Political Agent, Wana, North-West Frontier Province
Arthur Congreve Miller, Educational Inspector, on special duty as Provincial Secretary, Boy Scouts Council, Bombay
Frederick Walford, Principal, Bihar School of Engineering, Bihar and Orissa
Frederick H. Andrews, late Principal, Amar Singh Technical Institute, Srinagar, Kashmir
Henry Martin, Principal, Islamia College, Peshawar, North-West Frontier Province
Khan Bahadur Mahbub Mian Imam Baksh Kadri, Bombay Civil Service, Joint Judge and Additional Sessions Judge, Ahmedabad, Bombay
Basil Martin Sullivan, Consulting Architect to Government, Punjab
Raj Bahadur Shyam Narain Singh  an official Member of the Legislative Assembly
Rustom Rustomjee
William Teague Everali, Indian State Railways

On the termination of the administrative functions of the British South Africa Company in Southern Rhodesia and in Northern Rhodesia —
Percy Johnstone Baird, Chief Accountant, London Office, British South Africa Company
Edmund Noel Carlton, Assistant Secretary to the Government, and Clerk of the Executive Legislative Councils, Northern Rhodesia
Gerard Duncombe Clough, Attorney-General, formerly Legal Adviser and Public Prosecutor, Northern Rhodesia
Claude Hatherley Dobree, Treasurer, Northern Rhodesia
Walter Musgrave Raton  Assistant Medical Director and Medical Superintendent, Ingutsheni Mental Hospital, Bulawayo, Southern Rhodesia
Lancelot Middleton Foggin, Director of Education, Southern Rhodesia
Hugh Morrison Gower Jackson, Superintendent of Natives, Southern Rhodesia
Arthur Percy Millar, Secretary, London Office, British South Africa Company

Honorary Officers
Amin Rizk, an Officer of the Land Department, Palestine

Member of the Order of the British Empire (MBE)

Military Division
Royal Navy
Major-General Thomas Owen Marden 
Colonel Berkeley Vincent 

Army
Lieutenant Frank William Allbones, 1st Battalion, The Lincolnshire Regiment
Regimental Sergeant-Major Randolph Beard  2nd Battalion, Grenadier Guards
Company Sergeant-Major Harry Beaumont, 6th Battalion (Territorial), The East Surrey Regiment
Regimental Sergeant-Major Ernest Daniel Britton  3rd Battalion, Coldstream Guards
Quartermaster and Captain William Bromage, Royal Army Service Corps
Deputy Commissary of Ordnance and Captain William Henry Bunt, Royal Army Ordnance Corps
Lieutenant George Henry Curtis Dale, Army Educational Corps
Lieutenant William Charles Palliser Dawson, Royal Tank Corps
Captain David Sextus Percy Douglas, 51st (Highland) Divisional Signals, Royal Corps of Signals, Territorial Army
Regimental Sergeant-Major Thomas Elliott, The Royal Scots Greys
Captain George Edmund Framingham  The Royal Warwickshire Regiment
Lieutenant William Raphael Gatt, Royal Malta Artillery, Adjutant, King's Own Malta Regiment
Lieutenant Robert Samuel Gearing, Army Educational Corps
Lieutenant Laurence Douglas Grand, Royal Engineers
Regimental Sergeant-Major Cecil Harradine  1st Battalion, Irish Guards
Quartermaster and Captain Charles James Haven, The Scottish Horse, Territorial Army
Quartermaster and Lieutenant Ernest Fred Hayball, 2nd Battalion, Highland Light Infantry
Company Sergeant-Major Charles Frederick Hayman  1st Battalion, Coldstream Guards
Quartermaster and Lieutenant Frank Huband  1st Battalion, The North Staffordshire Regiment
Superintending Clerk Ernest Alexander Lewis, Royal Engineers
Regimental Sergeant-Major Henry James Martin, 1st Battalion, East Kent Regiment
Quartermaster and Captain Evelyn Harold Pearcey, Royal Engineers
Major Reginald Clare Periton, 7th Battalion (Territorial) The King's Regiment
Quartermaster and Lieutenant Archibald George Porters  Extra Regimentally Employed List
Quartermaster and Captain James Robert Robinson  5th Battalion. (Territorial), The Durham Light Infantry
Staff Quartermaster-Sergeant George Arthur Seymour, Royal Army Service Corps
Regimental Quartermaster-Sergeant William Soughton  2nd Battalion, The Royal Sussex Regiment
Captain Arthur Troops (Retired Pay), Regular Army Reserve of Officers, The Sherwood Foresters, employed Recruiting Duties
Lieutenant (D.O.) Francis George Young, Royal Artillery
Subadar Bara Singh, 120th (Ambala) Pack Battery, Artillery, Indian Army
Lieutenant Edwin Borton, Indian Army Reserve of Officers, attached Indian Army Service Corps
Captain William Walter Brindley, 10th Baluch Regiment, Indian Army
Conductor Alfred Edward Ellis, India Miscellaneous List
Lieutenant Leonard Arthur Goddard, Indian Army Reserve of Officers
Captain Gordon Saffery Johnson  1st Madras Pioneers, Indian Army
Deputy Commissary and Captain Harry Joyner, India Miscellaneous List
Assistant Commissary and Lieutenant James Leonard Kenny, India Miscellaneous List
Subadar Nur Ali, 1/13th Frontier Force Bales, Indian Army
Jemadar Painda Khan (II),  Indian Army Service Corps
Deputy Commissary and Captain Ralph Wright, Indian Army Service Corps

Royal Air Force
Flying Officer Robert Samuel Bruce
Flying Officer Ernest Whittlesea 
Observer Officer Kenneth Cordell McKenzie 
Sergeant-Major Class I Richard Eric Gorwood

Civil Division

Wilfred Herbert Brattle, Assistant Accountant, War Office
Charles Bastable, Late Superintendent, O. Division, Metropolitan Police
Harold Edmund Bell, Secretary, Anglo-Egyptian War Cemeteries Executive Committee
Barbara Margaret Best, Junior Administrative Assistant, Foreign Office
Wallace Broad, Manager, Edgware Road Employment Exchange
G. R. Coghlin, Head of Separation Section, Disposal and Liquidation Commission
Cecil Courtice, Head of Alien Visa Section, Passport Office, Foreign Office
Inspector John Brodie Craib, Ayr Burgh Constabulary
Minnie Crocker, Higher Clerical Officer, Ministry of Pensions
Allen Patrick Cunningham, Higher Clerical Officer, War Office
Henry Dyer, Staff Clerk, Board of Inland Revenue
Captain William Henderson Fyffe, District Commandant, Royal Ulster Constabulary
Superintendent Shadrack Garrett, Bournemouth Division, Hampshire Constabulary
Chief Superintendent P. Gregson, Lancashire Constabulary
Herbert Gosling, Manager, Dundee Employment Exchange
Edward James Lambert Hall, Clerk to the Lord Chief Justice
George Hall, District Inspector, Royal Ulster Constabulary
Major William Thomas Hanson, Chief Clerk to Assistant Director of Ordnance Service (Provision), War Office
Albert Edward Harrison, Manager, Leeds Employment Exchange
Thomas James Harman, Staff Clerk, War Office
Amos Hayes, Assistant Clerk, General Superintendent's Office, Military Department, L.M. & S. Railway
William Angus Boyd Iliff, Superintending Officer, Ministry of Labour, Northern Ireland
John James, Staff Clerk, Board of Inland Revenue
Arthur Richard Jeffrey, Member, East Ham and Barking War Pensions Committee
Robert Johnson, Officer, Board of Customs and Excise
Albert Edward Lines, Ex-soldier Clerk, War Office
Captain Henry Edward Maskew, Transport Officer, France, Imperial War Graves Commission
George Roland McConnell, Higher Executive Officer, Ministry of Commerce, Northern Ireland
Superintendent James Arthur McCoy, Liverpool Constabulary
Superintendent Donald McLennan, Deputy Chief Constable of Renfrewshire
Septimus Richard Medwin, Higher Clerical Officer, Board of Customs and Excise
Superintendent Charles Frederick Melville, Whitehaven Division, Cumberland Constabulary
Annie Norman, Junior Administrative Assistant, Foreign Office
Gwendoline Evelyn Mary O'Rorke, Voluntary Worker, St. Pancras & Hampstead War Pensions Committee
Evan Ortner, Superintendent of the Technical Schools, Woolwich Arsenal
James Patient, Inspector in Office of Director of Stamping, Board of Inland Revenue
Superintendent Frederick Petty, Bradford Constabulary
William Booth Potts, Manager, Liverpool Employment Exchange
Thomas Reuben Reynolds, for Services to Disposal and Liquidation Commission
C. Sammut, Pensioner Clerk, War Office
Walter Robert Shipway, Staff Clerk, Colonial Office
Annie Simonds, Vice-Chairman, Bradford, Shipley and District War Pensions Committee
Superintendent Ralph John Smith, Deputy Chief Constable and Chief Clerk, Nottinghamshire Constabulary
Commander William Henry St. Ledger, Commander of Revenue Cutter Vigilant
Fred Tanner, Accountant Royal Military College, Sandhurst
Hugh Elkin Thompson, District Commandant, Ulster Special Constabulary
Percy Wanbridge, Member of Taunton, Yeovil and District War Pensions Committee
Colonel Henry Waring, Area Commandant, Ulster Special Constabulary
Constance May Whitmore, Voluntary Worker, Birmingham and District War Pensions Committee
Ronald McKinnon Wood  Principal Technical Assistant, Royal Air Craft Establishment, Farnborough
Dallas Hales Wilkie Young, Clerk, Admiralty Marshal's Office
Superintendent Edward Young, Deputy Chief Constable, Somersetshire Constabulary

Diplomatic Service and Overseas List
Henry William Burnett, His Majesty's Vice Consul at Maldonado, Uruguay
Paul Cassar, Pro-Consul at Alexandria
Francis Alexander Chambers, Archivist at His Majesty's Legation, The Hague
Gabriel Farwagi, Pro-Consul at Cairo
William Brehmer Harding Green, Consular Department, Foreign Office
Frederick Greenwood, His Majesty's Legation, Warsaw
Vincent John Hughes Laferla, Registrar of His Majesty's Supreme Court, Alexandria
Reginald Percy Ray, Translator at His Majesty's Legation, Lisbon
Walter Henry Weedon, Temp. Vice Consul at His Majesty's Legation, Ohristiania
Francis Charles Benjamin Wood, late Passport Control Officer in Holland

Colonies, Protectorates, etc.
William James Bramwell, lately Telegraph Engineer, Posts and Telegraph Department, Gold Coast
Ezekiel Cohen, Principal Clerk in the Office of the High Commissioner for South Africa
Henry Charles Cottle, formerly Government Printer, Ceylon
David George Goonewardena, Crown Proctor of Gall©, Ceylon
Selim Hanna, Assistant District Commandant of Police, Northern District, Palestine
Georgiana Humphries, Headmistress of the Central School, Eldoret, Kenya Colony
Samuel Benjamin Jones, Medical Officer and Magistrate, and Coroner, Anguilla, Leeward Islands
The Reverend Father Christopher James Kirk, of the Mill Hill Mission, Uganda Protectorate; in recognition of his services to the Administration
Annie Landau, Principal of Evelina de Rothschild's School, Jerusalem; in recognition of her public services
John Vincent Leach, Resident Magistrate, Parish of St. Catherine, Jamaica
Joseph Henry Levy, Chairman of the Parochial Board of St. Ann, Jamaica
Charles Neale, First Inspector of Civil Jails, Iraq
Sister Emma Ollerenshaw, of the Deaconess's Society of Wesleyans, Johannesburg, Union of South Africa; in recognition of her public services.
Silverio Izidro Samuel, Confidential Clerk to the Governor of Nigeria

British India
Mary Louisa, Lady Giles, Burma
Walter Henry Murphy, Executive Engineer to the Municipal Commission, Civil and Military Station, Bangalore, Mysore
George Collie Cheyne, Deputy Conservator of Forests, Burma
Khan Bahadur Muhammad Kalim-ul-Lah Sahib Chida, Assistant Commissioner of Police, Madras
St. George Alexander Beaty, Deputy Superintendent of Police, Punjab
Frederic Lionel Gilbert, Superintendent, Government Press, Madras
Captain Arthur Ambrose Emmanuel Baptist, Assistant Director, School of Tropical Medicine and Hygiene, Calcutta
Gladice Keevil Rickford, Bombay
Khan Bahadur Maneokji Mavroji Meihta, Merchant and Motor Factory Proprietor, Poona, Bombay
Minim Augustus Fernandez, Superintendent and Treasury Officer, Maskat, Persian Gulf
Charles Attwood Knyvett-Hough, Head Clerk, British Legation, Nepal

On the termination of the administrative functions of the British South Africa Company in Southern Rhodesia and in Northern Rhodesia —
George Curtis Candler, Assistant Secretary, London Office, British South Africa Company
Harold Vansittart Francis, Chief Clerk in the Secretariat, Northern Rhodesia
Lieutenant Harry Hammond, British South Africa Police, Assistant District Superintendent, Criminal Investigation Department, and Assistant Chief Immigration Officer, Southern Rhodesia
Arthur Rickman Hone, lately Private Secretary to the Administrator, Southern Rhodesia
Herbert Stanley Keigwin, Director of Native Development, Southern Rhodesia

Honorary Members
Mustafa el Khipry, Mayor of Ramleh, Palestine; in recognition of his services to the Administration
Naounr Effendi Tajir, Assistant Collector of Customs and Excise, Iraq

Kaisar-i-Hind Medal
First Class
Alice Edith, Countess of Reading 
Sreemathi Panapilla Kartiyani Pilla Bhagavathi Pilla Kochamma, Vadasseri Ammaveedu, daughter of His Highness the Maharaja of Travancore, Madras
The Right Reverend Bishop Francis Stephen Coppel, Nagpur, Central Provinces
The Reverend Arthur Herbert Bestall, General Superintendent of Wesleyan Missions in Burma
Dr. M. R. Ry. Pazhamarneri Sundaram Ayyar
Chandra Sekhara, Ayyar Avargal, Director of the Tuberculosis Institute and Hospital, Madras
Cowasji Jehangir, Bombay
Bad Bahadur, Upendra Nath Brahmachari, Additional Physician, Out-Patient Department, Medical College Hospital, Bengal
Edwin Sheard, Adjutant, Salvation Army, United Provinces
Raj Bahadur Lala Mathra Das, Assistant Surgeon in the Punjab
Pir Puran Nath Mahant, Mahant of Bohar in the Rohtak District, Punjab

British Empire Medal (BEM)

For Gallantry

Constable Francis Austin Morteshed, Royal Ulster Constabulary
Constable Samuel Orr, Ulster Special Constabulary

For Meritorious Service
Joseph Bowman, Marshal of His Majesty's Supreme Court in Constantinople
Head Constable William Duffy, Royal Ulster Constabulary
Trooper Gerald Martin, British South African Police
Head Constable Robert Samuel Pakenham, Royal Ulster Constabulary
Victor Beckwith Pare

King's Police Medal (KPM)

Muhammad Haider, Constable, United Provinces Police
Gauhar Singh, Naik, United Provinces Police
Hari Singh Parmar, Sub-Inspector, United Provinces Police
Ghulam Husain, Head Constable, United Provinces Police
Muhammad Aslam Khan, Sub-Inspector, United Provinces Police
Rana Hari Singh, Sub-Inspector, United Provinces Police

Imperial Service Order (ISO)
Home Civil Service

William Jackson Bean, Curator, Royal Botanical Gardens, Kew
Edward Bilcliffe, Superintending Clerk, Department of the Accountant General, Admiralty
Alfred Henry Bridgman, Higher Clerical Officer, Colonial Office
James Robert Burnage, Senior Chief Superintendent, Mapping Branch, Land Registry
Walter George Coles  Chief Surveyor, Board of Agriculture for Scotland
Charles Percy Cooke, Accountant, British Museum
Charles Alfred Dance, Senior non-professional Clerk, Treasury Solicitor's Department
Gabriel Day, Inspector of Shipping, Royal Arsenal, Woolwich
William Frederick Doust, Chief Clerk, National Debt Office
George Gordon, Staff Officer, Ministry of Transport
Robert Henshall, Senior Intelligence Officer, Department of Overseas Trade
Thomas Robinson Johnson, Senior Staff Clerk, Ministry of Health
William Locke  Accountant, Office of Works
Joseph Putnam, Deputy Director of Audit, Exchequer and Audit Department
Leonard Walter Thomas, Clerk for Factory Statistics, Home Office
Frederick John Webb, Assistant Inspector, Board of Education

Colonial Civil Service
Gaspard Garabet Amirayan, Assistant King's Advocate, Cyprus
Arthur Thomas Bothamley, Clerk Assistant of the Legislative Council and Gentleman Usher of the Black Rod, Dominion of New Zealand
James Arthur Edward Bullock  Chief Clerk, Colonial Secretary's Department, Hong Kong
Leon Koenig, Assistant Colonial Secretary, Mauritius
Inche Abdul Razak bin Haji Gani, the Dato Stia di Raja of Selangor, Federated Malay States
John Kidston Reid, Clerk of the House of Assembly, State of Tasmania
Herbert Paul St. Julian, Colonial Postmaster, Fiji
John Flavius Thompson, Sub-Assistant Treasurer, Gold Coast
Cecil Hamilton Tucker, Colonial Postmaster, Bermuda
Wallis Harry Brinsley White, Chief Inspector of Schools, Orange Free State, Union of South Africa

Indian Civil Service

Walter Samuel Snow, Superintendent, Central Jail, Rajamundry, Madras
Babu Chandra Nath Sarma, Personal Assistant to the Director of Land Records, Assam
William Albert-Samuel, Assistant Secretary to Government, Irrigation Department, Bihar and Orissa
Stephen Karam Singh, Superintendent, Central Police Office, Punjab
William George Slaney, City Magistrate, Nagpur, Central Provinces
Andrew Muhiuddin, Superintendent, Deputy Commissioner's Office, Jhelum, Punjab
Willie Bwye, Registrar, Punjab Irrigation Secretariat, Public Works Department, Punjab
Raj Sahib Nivaran Chancier Gupta, Head Clerk and Superintendent, Office of the Deputy Judge Advocate-General, Northern Command
Ernest Cecil Lisbey, Head Clerk to the Commanding Royal Engineer, Baluchistan District, and Secretary in the Public Works Department to the Agent to the Governor General, Baluchistan
Jose Francisco Vaz, Officiating Superintendent, Rajputana Agency Office

Imperial Service Medal (ISM)

Kolandaswami, late Duffadar, High Court, Madras
Sheikh Moideen SaJaib, late Head Warder, Madras Jail Department, Madras
Carunguli Thirumalai Nayudu, late Attender, High Court, Madras
Baldeosing Dhondesing, late Naik in the Executive Engineer's Office, East Khandesh District, Bombay
Trumpet Major Shaikh Jainudin Shaikh Ismail, late 1st Grade Kote-Duffadar, Kathiawar Agency Police, Bombay
Munne Ali, late Jemadar to the Governor, United Provinces
Raghunandan Shukul, late Head Constable, Chhindwara, Central Provinces

References

Birthday Honours
1924 awards
1924 in Australia
1924 in Canada
1924 in India
1924 in New Zealand
1924 in the United Kingdom